Zylfije Bajramaj (born 2 October 1997) is a Kosovan-born Albanian footballer who plays as a forward and has appeared for the Albania women's national team.

Career
Bajramaj has been capped for the Albania national team, appearing for the team during the 2019 FIFA Women's World Cup qualifying cycle.

See also
List of Albania women's international footballers

References

External links
 
 
 

1997 births
Living people
Albanian women's footballers
Women's association football forwards
Albania women's international footballers
Kosovan women's footballers
KFF Hajvalia players
Kosovan people of Albanian descent
Sportspeople of Albanian descent